"All Shook Up" is a song by Elvis Presley.

All Shook Up may also refer to:

All Shook Up (musical), a jukebox musical featuring the music of Elvis Presley
All Shook Up (Cheap Trick album)
All Shook Up (Sophie Koh album)
"All Shook Up" (Sledge Hammer!), an episode of the TV series Sledge Hammer!
"All Shook Up", an episode of the TV series Lois & Clark: The New Adventures of Superman